Lāsma Zemene is a Latvian police officer, who was crowned Mis Latvija and represented her nation in the 2015 Miss World competition.

In a 2017 interview, she said that she continues to work as a public relations specialist in the Riga Municipal Police.

References 

Year of birth missing (living people)
Living people
Latvian beauty pageant winners
Latvian police officers
Miss World 2015 delegates